Walter Henrique de Oliveira (born October 21, 1968) is a former Brazilian football player.

Club statistics

References

External links

1968 births
Living people
Brazilian footballers
Brazilian expatriate footballers
J1 League players
J2 League players
Japan Football League (1992–1998) players
Júbilo Iwata players
Honda FC players
Hokkaido Consadole Sapporo players
Montedio Yamagata players
Expatriate footballers in Japan
Association football midfielders